Kaithal Assembly constituency is one of the 90 constituencies in the Haryana Legislative Assembly of Haryana a northern state of India. Kaithal is also part of Kurukshetra Lok Sabha constituency.

Members of Legislative Assembly

See also

 Kaithal
 Kaithal district
 List of constituencies of the Haryana Legislative Assembly

References

Assembly constituencies of Haryana
Kaithal district